Ham Seok-heon (13 March 1901 – 4 February 1989) was a notable figure in the Religious Society of Friends (Quaker) movement in Korea, and was nicknamed the "Gandhi of Korea." Ham was an important Asian voice for human rights and non-violence during the 20th century, despite numerous imprisonments for his convictions. He was a Quaker who concluded that all religions are on common ground in terms of human beings, a view shared by many Quakers.

He encouraged peace and democracy and promoted non-violence movement known as “seed idea” (ssi-al sasang), consistently present in his books Korean History Seen through a Will published in 1948, Human Revolution in 1961, History and People in 1964, and Queen of Suffering: a spiritual history of Korea edited in 1985. He was also a poet and wrote about 120 poems such as “Song of the West Wind” written in 1983.
In 2000, Sok-Hon Ham was selected by the Republic of Korea as a national cultural figure.

Early life
Ham was born in Pyong-an Province, currently North Korea and grew up as a Presbyterian Christian. In 1919, he joined the March 1st Movement, the beginning of Korean resistance to Japanese occupation. He lost his place in Pyongyang Public High School. In 1923 he graduated from Osan High School and  went to Japan to study to become a teacher. There he first encountered the Non-Church movement, an indigenous Japanese Christian movement that had no liturgy, sacraments or ordained clergy. It spoke out against social injustices and advocated pacifism.

Biography

 March 13, 1901: Born in North Pyong'an Province (Yong-Cheon)
 1906: Entered a missionary school of Deok-il Elementary School
 1914: Graduated from Deok-il Elementary School
 1916: Graduated from Yang-shi Public Elementary School, and entered Pyongyang public high school
 1919: After protesting against Japanese colonial regime in Korea, quit Pyongyang public highschool
 1923: Graduated from Osan high school, and went to Japan to take his studies in Tokyo school of education
 1924-1928: Studied the bible under Uchimura Kanzo with Kim Kyo-shin and Song Du-Yong
 1928: Graduated from Tokyo school of education
 1928-1938: Taught history and ethics at Osan highschool
 1934: Serially published “Korean History Seen through a Will” in ‘Seong-seo Chosun’ magazine
 1938: After protesting against Japanese colonial regime in Korea, quit working as a teacher at Osan highschool
 1940-1941: After working at Songsan agricultural&educational school, imprisoned as a protester against the Japanese colonial regime (schemed by the Japanese colonial regime)
 1942-1943: After writing several articles against Japanese colonial regime in Korea for a monthly magazine 'Seong-seo-Chosun(Bible Korea)', imprisoned at Seo-Dae-Moon prison
 1945: Appointed as a minister of education for Northern Pyung-an province
 1947: Imprisoned as an organizer or of a student protests against the Soviet (schemed by the Soviet)
 1956: He criticized social and political problems in an editorial paper, Sasang-gye.
 1958: Imprisoned for writing an article “Must be a Thinking People to Live” which criticizes the autocratic regime and began his religious career as the Korean representative of Quaker.
 1961-1963: Studied at the Quaker schools Pendle Hill in the US and Woodbrooke in Britain.
 1963: Protested against General Park Chung-hee becoming to run for the presidency
 1965: Protested against Japanese regime and president Park Chung-hee for their attempt for an alliance
 1974: After protesting against President Park Chung-hee for his attempt to change the constitution to be elected again, convicted
 1979: Nominated for Nobel peace prize by American Friends Service Committee
 1985: Nominated again for Nobel peace prize by American Friends Service Committee
 1987: received the first Inchon-award, given to a person who contributed in the development of press and media.
 February 4, 1989: Died in Seoul National University Hospital
 2002: After his death, he received the “Accolade for Founding a Nation”, as a sign of recognition from the nation.

Bibliography
 Kim Sung-soo, Biography of a Korean Quaker, Ham Sok-hon, Seoul: Samin Books, 2001, 360 pp.

See also
 Christianity in Korea
 List of Koreans

External links

Interviews with Teacher Ham
Korean Ham, Sok Hon website

1901 births
1989 deaths
South Korean philosophers
Prisoners and detainees of Japan
Prisoners and detainees of South Korea
Korean human rights activists
Korean anti-war activists
South Korean democracy activists
South Korean prisoners and detainees
Korean Quakers
Quaker philosophers
Quaker socialists
20th-century Quakers